Jemgum is a municipality in the Leer district, in the northwest of Lower Saxony, Germany. The area is known as Rheiderland (German) or Reiderland (Dutch). Rheiderland is located in East Friesland.

History

Jemgum was the site of the Battle of Jemmingen on 21 July 1568, an early event of the Eighty Years' War, in which a Spanish army defeated 
a Dutch Rebel army under Louis of Nassau.

References

Populated places established in the 8th century
Towns and villages in East Frisia
Leer (district)
Rheiderland